Alice Thomas may refer to:

People
Alice Thomas (actress), directed by Raymond B. West

Fictional characters
Alice Thomas, character in American Perfekt
Alice Thomas, character in Cut of Ice
Alice Thomas, character in Don't Go Near the Water (novel)

See also
Alice Thomas Ellis, writer
Alys Thomas, swimmer